Golda is an American-British biographical drama film directed by Guy Nattiv from a screenplay by Nicholas Martin. The film depicts the life of Golda Meir, Prime Minister of Israel, particularly during the Yom Kippur War.

It received its world premiere at the 2023 Berlin International Film Festival on February 20, 2023.

Cast
 Helen Mirren as Golda Meir
 Camille Cottin as Lou Kaddar
 Rami Heuberger as Moshe Dayan
 Ohad Knoller as Ariel Sharon
 Lior Ashkenazi as David Elazar
 Dominic Mafham as Haim Bar-Lev
 Ellie Piercy as Shir Shapiro
 Ed Stoppard as Benny Peled
 Rotem Keinan as Zvi Zamir
 Dvir Benedek as Eli Zeira
 Ben Caplan
 Kit Rakusen
 Emma Davies as Miss Epstein 
 Liev Schreiber as Henry Kissinger
 Jaime Ray Newman as Henry Kissinger's Secretary

Production

Development
In April 2021, it was announced Helen Mirren was set to star, with Guy Nattiv to direct, a screenplay by Nicholas Martin. In November 2021, Camille Cottin, Rami Heuberger, Lior Ashkenaz, Ellie Piercy, Ed Stoppard, Rotem Keinan, Dvir Benedek, Dominic Mafham, Ben Caplan, Kit Rakusen and Emma Davies joined the cast. In January 2022, Liev Schreiber announced his involvement.

Filming
Principal photography began on November 8, 2021, in London, United Kingdom.

Casting controversy
In January 2022, British comedienne Maureen Lipman criticized the casting of Helen Mirren in the film, stating: "I'm sure she will be marvellous, but it would never be allowed for Ben Kingsley to play Nelson Mandela. You just couldn't even go there." The following month, Mirren responded by saying Lipman was "utterly legitimate" to criticize her casting, and she had discussed the decision to cast her in the film with director Nattiv.

Release
In July 2021, Bleecker Street acquired U.S. distribution rights to the film. In September 2022, the MPA gave the film a PG-13 for "thematic material and pervasive smoking".

References

External links
 

2020s biographical drama films
American biographical drama films
Bleecker Street films
British biographical drama films
Casting controversies in film
Cultural depictions of Golda Meir
Cultural depictions of Henry Kissinger
Films based on actual events
Films set in 1973
Films set in Israel
Films set in the 1970s
Films shot in Israel
Films shot in London
Upcoming films
Yom Kippur War